Railway Campus (CSU) station is a subway station in Tianxin District, Changsha, Hunan, China, operated by the Changsha subway operator Changsha Metro. It entered revenue service on June 28, 2016.

History 
The station opened on 28 June 2016.

Layout

Surrounding area
Entrance No. 3: Railway Campus of Central South University, Hunan Radio and TV University, Hunan Network Engineering Vocational College, Central South University of Forestry and Technology

References

Railway stations in Hunan
Railway stations in China opened in 2016
Railway stations in China at university and college campuses